Chiraps alloica is a moth of the family Tortricidae. It is widely distributed in the Oriental region, from the Himalayas to Indonesia, including Bhutan, Thailand, western Malaysia, Vietnam and Taiwan.

References

Archipini
Moths described in 1948
Taxa named by Alexey Diakonoff